The Order of the Ermine (L’Ordre de l’Hermine) was originally a chivalric order of the 14th and 15th centuries in the Duchy of Brittany. The ermine is the emblem of Brittany. In the 20th century, it was revived by the Cultural Institute of Brittany as an honor for those contributing to Breton culture. It was created in 1972 to honor those who contribute to Breton culture and development. At its head is a Chancellor (Yves Lainé) and two vice-chancellors: Riwanon Kervella and André Lavanant. The siege is at the Institut Culturel de Bretagne, the castle of the Ermine, Vannes.

Recipients

 In 1972 at Pontivy : René Pleven
 In 1973 at Rome : Gabriele Pescatore
 In 1973 at Rennes : Jean Mévellec
 In 1988 at Rennes : Vefa de Bellaing, Pierre-Roland Giot, Polig Monjarret, Henri Queffélec
 In 1989 at Nantes : Per Denez, Louis Lichou, Bernard de Parades, Maryvonne Quéméré-Jaouen
 In 1990 at Auray : Charles Le Gall, Émile Le Scanv (Glenmor), Joseph Martray, Albert Trévidic
 In 1991 at Quimper : Georges Lombard, Robert Le Grand, Pierre Laurent, Pierre-Jakez Hélias
 In 1992 at Saint-Malo : Ronan Huon, Yvonne Jean-Haffen, Michel Phlipponneau, Jordi Pujol
 In 1993 at Dinan : Anna-Vari Arzur, Herry Caouissin, Yann Poilvet, Jean Tricoire
 In 1994 at Vannes : Ivetig an Dred-Kervella, Pierre Le Moine, Yvonig Gicquel, Alan Stivell
 In 1995 at Guérande : Jacques Briard, Jean Fréour, Lois Kuter, Ivona Martin, Loeiz Ropars
 In 1996 at Pont-l'Abbé : André Lavanant, Joseph Lec'hvien, Pierre Le Treut, Rita Morgan Williams
 In 1997 at Quintin : Jean-Jacques Hénaff, Jean L'Helgouach, Dodik Jegou, Raymond Lebosse
 In 1998 at Vitré : Goulc'han Kervella, Henri Maho, Pierre Loquet, Naig Rozmor
 In 1999 at Nantes : Jean-Bernard Vighetti, Riwanon Kervella, Patrick Malrieu, Denise Delouche
 In 2000 at Pontivy : Tereza Desbordes, Lena Louarn, René Vautier, Pierre-Yves Le Rhun
 In 2001 at Landerneau : Rozenn Milin, Pierre Toulhoat, Marc Simon, Dan Ar Braz
 In 2002 at Lannion : Henri Lécuyer, Yves Rocher, Michael Jones, Robert Omnes
 In 2003 at Saint-Malo : René Abjean, Angèle Jacq, Jean-Louis Latour, Gilles Servat
 In 2004 at Châteaubriant : Albert Poulain, Yannig Baron, Marie Kermarec, Yann Goasdoué, Pierre-Yves Moign
 In 2005 at Loctudy : Ewa Waliszewska, Jean Kerhervé, Pierre Le Padellec, Jean Ollivro
 In 2006 at Ploemeur : Claudine Mazeas, Jean Pierre Vincent, Xavier Leclerc, Claude Sterckx
 In 2007 at Saint-Brieuc : Rhisiart Hincks, Job an Irien, Martial Pézénnec, François Le Quémener
 In 2008 at Rennes: Gweltaz ar Fur, Yvonne Breilly Le-Calvez, Viviane Hélias, Roger Abjean
 In 2009 at Ancenis : Jean-Christophe Cassard, Tugdual Kalvez, Yann-Fanch Kemener et Jean-Guy Le Floc'h, et Mona Ozouf, awarded during the Festival du Libre en Bretagne de Guérande le 21 novembre.
 In 2010 at Lorient: Catherine Latour, Annaig Renault, Donatien Laurent et André Chédeville.
 In 2011 at Quimper : Andréa ar Gouilh, Yann Choucq, Joseph Le Bihan, and André Pochon
 In 2012 at Guingamp : Albert Boché, Yves Lainé, Ivonig Le Merdy and the brothers Morvan

References 

History of Brittany
Ermine, Order of the
Ermine